Tariq Masih Gill is a Pakistani politician who was a Member of the Provincial Assembly of the Punjab, from May 2013 to May 2018.

Early life
He was born on 10 November 1962.

Political career

He was elected to the Provincial Assembly of the Punjab as a candidate of Pakistan Muslim League (N) on reserved seat for minorities in 2013 Pakistani general election.

In December 2013, he was appointed as Parliamentary Secretary for human rights & minorities.

References

Living people
Punjab MPAs 2013–2018
Pakistan Muslim League (N) MPAs (Punjab)
1962 births
Punjab MPAs 2018–2023